Stephanie Florence Colosse (born 1987) is a French citizen and beauty queen from Martinique.

Colosse won the title of Miss Martinique World in June 2005, also winning Best Smile and the Most Photogenic Award. She is the second contestant to represent Martinique at Miss World. She is 171 cm tall.

She is currently studying towards her diploma in biological sciences so that she can become a member of her country's scientific police force and is aiming to become a nurse.

Colosse is participating in Miss World 2006 and was a finalist in the sports Fast Track event.

References

External links
  Stephanie's Official Miss World Profile
 Miss Martinique World 2006/07
 Miss Martinique Interview at Trident Beauties.com

1987 births
Living people
People from Fort-de-France
Martiniquais beauty pageant winners
Miss World 2006 delegates
Martiniquais female models